Monteils is a commune in the Tarn-et-Garonne department in the Occitanie region in southern France.

Its inhabitants are called Monteillais in French.

Geography
The commune is located in the Quercy on the river Lère to the east of Caussade, in an undulating countryside. Farmland, woods, meadows closed by hedges or dry stone walls, form the bulk of its natural identity.

History

According to the Boscus, Monteils made his first appearance in history in 1165.  For a bubble of Pope Alexander III, the chapter of Saint-Antonin is maintained in the possession of the church Monteils known under the name of St. John the Baptist.

However, after Jacques Neveu, important discoveries (tombs dated around the sixth century AD, four sites Gallo-Roman, the most important is the SES, jewelry, flint, bifaces seem ...), show that life existed there are more than 150 000 years in our region.

The Church of Monteils was once included in taillable of Caussade. The community of Caussade had been originally made up of seven parishes: Notre Dame del Fraysse, Saint-Sernin-of-Montevols, Saint-Pierre-de-l'Herm (The Benèche), Saint-Martin-de-Sesquières Saint -Jean-de Monteil, Ciric-saint-of-Colombia, Saint-Pierre-de-Milhac.  (after C. Sahuc)

The territory included in the common Monteils was confined to several lords (the Milhac the Peyrelade, the Bazagues the JAGOTA ...). There was even a family name Monteils around 1300. . Castle of Monteils is mentioned for the first time in a title of the year 1239.  (from L. Boscus)

In 1622 rose disputes between residents and Monteils Caussade about the appointment of Antoine noble Manas as trustee Catholic. The two sides came to the hands and the deep antagonism then divides the two parishes until 1729. (d’après L. Boscus) (from L. Boscus)

In 1728, Pierre Lacombe, squire, Lord of Monteils, authority of the royal justice roy wants to obtain the separation of the parish of Monteils the community of Caussade.  It is more glorious for him to be lord of the community Monteils as the parish Monteils. Caussade initiate a legal battle against the resale of justice.  (after C. Sahuc)

On 24 May 1729, a ruling Council of State declared in Compiègne disunity between the 2 parishes. The litigation is continuing on both sides. (after C. Sahuc)

Monteils gets its land registry in 1757 to 1768.n The number of owner rose from about 160 in 1640 to 214 in 1768.  (after C. Sahuc)

Jean Lugan James is one of the first owners among residents in 1789.

In 1789, the list of grievances of Caussade door as the first claim the return of Monteils in the community. "This parish advantage of our conveniences and our local expenses without contributing in any way." (after C. Sahuc)

See also
Communes of the Tarn-et-Garonne department

References

Communes of Tarn-et-Garonne